HDF may refer to:
 Hadfield railway station (station code), in Derbyshire, England
 Hereditary Disease Foundation, an American organization
 Heringsdorf Airport (IATA code), near Garz on the island of Usedom, Germany
 Hierarchical Data Format, a file format
 High-density fiberboard, a type of very dense fibreboard, which is an engineered wood product
 Hortonworks DataFlow, an open-source real-time streaming analytics software platform
 Hôtel-Dieu de France, a Lebanese medical center
 Hubble Deep Field, an astronomical image
 Human Development Foundation, an organization in Thailand
 Hungarian Defence Force, the national defence force of Hungary
 Hydrodefluorination, a type of organic reaction